Lovington High School is the public senior high school of Lovington, New Mexico. Its colors are Royal Blue and White and its mascot is a Wildcat. It is a part of Lovington Municipal Schools.

History
A $600,000 bond financed the school, which opened in 1953. The athletic area next door includes a 5,000 seat stadium that cost $278,478 to build.

Athletics
Lovington's athletic teams have had some success throughout the school's history, winning 69 NMAA state championships in various sports. Most notably the football team has achieved greatest success winning 19 state championships, 2nd most in New Mexico, while finishing state runner-up six times (1972, 1989, 1994, 2003, 2005, 2008).

Football
 State Champions - 1951, 1952, 1957, 1958, 1960, 1968, 1969, 1970, 1986, 1987, 1990, 1995, 2000, 2001, 2004, 2009, 2010, 2011, 2021

Boys Basketball
 State Champions - 1949, 1983

Boys Track
 State Champions - 1966, 1969, 1970, 1977, 1978, 1980, 1981, 1982, 1984, 1985, 1987, 2003, 2004, 2005, 2006, 2009, 2010, 2011

Boys Golf
 State Champions - 1984, 1992, 1995, 2007, 2008, 2011

Baseball
 State Champions - 1963, 1973, 2006

Boys Soccer
 State Champions - 2022

Girls Basketball
 State Champions - 2011, 2012

Girls Track
 State Champions - 1978, 1979, 1983, 1984, 1985, 1988, 1989, 1996, 2000, 2001

Girls Golf
 State Champions - 1989

Softball
 State Champions - 2001, 2002

Cheer
 State Champions - 2018, 2019, 2021, 2022

 Girls Powerlifting
 State Champions - 2022

(Lovington also won 7 state championships (5 Boys {61, 63, 68, 70, 71} and 2 Girls {65, 66}) in gymnastics during the 1960s and 1970s.  Gymnastics is no longer a NMAA sponsored sport. This gives the Wildcats 76 state championships in school history.)

Notable alumni
Shirley Hooper, New Mexico Secretary of State
Brian Urlacher, 2018 Pro Football Hall of Fame inductee, and former All-Pro linebacker for Chicago Bears. Urlacher led the Wildcats to the 1995 AAA Football State championship.  2018 College Football Hall of Fame inductee and All-American linebacker for New Mexico Lobos football team.
Casey Urlacher, Arena Football League player
Ronnie Black, PGA Golf player

References

Public high schools in New Mexico
Schools in Lea County, New Mexico